The fifth season of the American crime and action drama Magnum P.I. premiered on February 19, 2023, on NBC, for the 2022–23 television season. It is the first season of the series to air on NBC after it was canceled by CBS following the conclusion of the previous season.

A remake of the 1980 series of the same name, Magnum P.I. centers on Thomas Magnum, a former Navy SEAL who works as a private investigator and solves mysteries with his business partner Juliet Higgins and other friends. The season stars Jay Hernandez, Perdita Weeks, Zachary Knighton, Stephen Hill, Amy Hill, and Tim Kang. It is set to consist of twenty episodes split into two parts. Larry Manetti, who starred on the original Magnum, P.I., is set to appear in an episode of the season as his Hawaii Five-0 character in a minor crossover event.

Cast and characters

Main 
 Jay Hernandez as Thomas Magnum, a former Navy SEAL who is a security consultant for the successful novelist Robin Masters, living in the guest house on his estate, while also working as a private investigator
 Perdita Weeks as Juliet Higgins, a former MI6 agent who is majordomo to Robin Masters; she and Magnum are partners in the PI business and, following the events of the previous season, pursuing a romantic relationship.
 Zachary Knighton as Orville "Rick" Wright, a Marine veteran and former door gunner, who runs his own tiki bar and is also a former playboy and is now a father.
 Stephen Hill as Theodore "T.C." Calvin, a Marine veteran and helicopter pilot who runs helicopter tours of Hawaii and is a member of Magnum's team.
 Amy Hill as Teuila "Kumu" Tuileta, the cultural curator of Robin Masters' estate.
 Tim Kang as suspended Honolulu Police Department (HPD) Detective Gordon Katsumoto, who "dislikes" Magnum but usually comes to the team's aid when needed.

Recurring 
 Michael Rady as HPD Detective Chris Childs, who took the job vacated by Katsumoto
 Bobby Lee as Jin Jeong
James Remar as Captain Buck Greene
Michael DeLara as M.E. Gabriel Santos 
Lee Anne Kuper as HPD Officer Lee

Guest 
 Emily Alana as Mahina
 Martin Martinez as Cade Jensen
 Lance Lim as Dennis Katsumoto
 Betsy Phillips as Suzy Madison

Crossover

 Larry Manetti as Nicky "The Kid" DeMarco

Episodes 

The number in the "No. overall" column refers to the episode's number within the overall series, whereas the number in the "No. in season" column refers to the episode's number within this particular season. "Production code" refers to the order in which the episodes were produced while "U.S. viewers (millions)" refers to the number of viewers in the U.S. in millions who watched the episode as it was aired.

Crossovers

Despite Hawaii Five-0 ending in 2020, Larry Manetti is still set to make a guest appearance in an episode of the season as his Hawaii Five-0 character, Nicky "The Kid" DeMarco, after previously making a guest appearance in the second season of Magnum P.I.

Production

Development 
On May 12, 2022, six days after the conclusion of the fourth season, Magnum P.I. was canceled by CBS. However, on May 23, 2022, it was reported by TVLine that Universal Television was trying to shop the series around. Ten days later, Deadline Hollywood reported that talks were underway for the series to potentially be carried by NBC and/or USA. Such a move would require a deal with CBS Studios by June 30, 2022, when the cast members' options on their contracts end. By June 10, Production Weekly reported a fifth season to be in "active development", though with no network attached to the listing. On June 30, 2022, NBC officially picked up the series for 20 episodes, initially to be split over two 10-episode seasons, with the option for more episodes. At the time, it was reported that the executive producers would return and CBS Studios and Universal TV would continue to co-produce the series. It was later clarified that the twenty episodes would be split as a two-part fifth season rather than into two separate seasons.

Filming and writing 
On July 4, 2022, it was reported by TVLine that production on the season would begin in late 2022. Filming began on September 19, 2022, with a traditional Hawaiian blessing. The season is being written at the same time as the sixth season.

Casting 
With the renewal in June 2022, it was expected that all six cast members would return. On October 3, 2022, it was reported by TVLine that Michael Rady has been cast in a recurring role as HPD Detective Chris Childs, debuting in the season premiere. Returning guest stars for the season include Emily Alana and Martin Martinez.

Release and marketing 
In July 2022, it was reported that the season not likely to premiere until January 2023 at the earliest. On November 7, 2022, it was announced that the season would premiere on February 19, 2023. The season airs on Sundays at 9:00 PM ET. It follows Dateline NBC and leads into the tenth season of The Blacklist. The season premiered with two back-to-back episodes. Each episode is available to stream on Peacock the day after it airs on NBC.

Ratings

References 

2023 American television seasons
Magnum, P.I.
Split television seasons